Sir Vincent Goncalves Glenday, KCMG, OBE (11 February 1891 – 30 April 1970) was a British colonial administrator. He was the Governor of Somaliland Protectorate from 1939 until the Italian occupation and British Resident in Zanzibar from 1946 to 1951.

References 

Colonial Administrative Service officers
1891 births
1970 deaths
Knights Commander of the Order of St Michael and St George
Officers of the Order of the British Empire
Governors of British Somaliland
British expatriates in Zanzibar